Reece Marshall (born 9 September 1994) is an English rugby union player currently playing for Aviva Premiership side Northampton Saints.
 
Marshall began his rugby career at Moulton College, where the likes of his Northampton Saints teammates Howard Packman, Tom Collins and Tom Stephenson also graduated, and progressed to become a full-time Saint in the 2013/14 season.

After moving to the Saints, Marshall was signed on a dual-registration with Old Albanians where he played during his first season with the top-flight Midlands side along with getting some game time with the Saints' second team, the Wanderers, which he has represented as captain.

Marshall has since gone on loan to Coventry, Moseley and for Nottingham alongside his duties at Saints.

The young hooker made in Premiership debut for Saints in February 2016 as the Midlands side faced London Irish and has since made 31 appearances and scoring 3 tries in a Saint shirt.

Marshall has also played the game at International level, representing the England Under-16s and England Under-18s respectively.

References 

1994 births
Living people
Rugby union hookers
Rugby union players from Luton